Rai Med was an Italian television channel owned and operated by RAI.

Overview 
Mainly devoted to the Maghreb area, the channel provided Arabic and Italian programming from RAI, including in particular an Arabic dub of the evening edition of TG3.

Rai Med was in a timeshare with Rai News 24 and Rai Italia during its broadcast. Rai Med closed down in April 2014 due to programming no longer existing since April 2012.

On 23 March 2016, Rai Med, which has been on a black screen for some time, was eliminated from the Hotbird frequency.

References

External links

Defunct RAI television channels
Television channels and stations established in 2001
Television channels and stations disestablished in 2014
2001 establishments in Italy
2014 disestablishments in Italy
Arabic-language television stations
Italian-language television stations